Two-Faced Woman is a 1941 American romantic comedy film directed by George Cukor and starring Greta Garbo in her final film role, Melvyn Douglas, Constance Bennett, and Roland Young. The movie was distributed by Metro-Goldwyn-Mayer.

Garbo plays a wife who pretends to be her own fictitious twin sister in order to recapture the affections of her estranged husband (Douglas), who has left her for a former girlfriend (Bennett). The film is generally regarded as the box-office flop that ended Garbo's career in an unsuccessful attempt to modernize or  "Americanize" her image in order to increase her shrinking fan base in the United States. By mutual agreement, Garbo's MGM contract was terminated shortly after Two-Faced Woman was released, and it became her last film.

Plot
Fashion magazine editor Larry Blake (Melvyn Douglas) marries ski instructor Karin Borg (Greta Garbo) on impulse, but she soon learns he expects her to be a dutiful wife, and not the independent woman she was when they met. They separate and Larry returns to New York City, where he takes up again with playwright Griselda Vaughn (Constance Bennett), with whom he was involved before his marriage.

Karin comes to New York to thwart the romance and get her husband back, playing her mythical twin sister Katherine Borg, a wild, amoral "modern" woman. Karin, in the guise of Katherine, fascinates Larry until he realizes the truth. He plays along, almost seducing his wife's purported twin sister, but stopping short each time. Karin and Larry eventually reunite on the ski slopes, and all is forgiven.

Cast
 Greta Garbo as Karin Borg Blake / Katherine Borg
 Melvyn Douglas as Larry Blake
 Constance Bennett as Griselda Vaughn
 Roland Young as O.O. Miller
 Robert Sterling as Dick Williams
 Ruth Gordon as Miss Ruth Ellis, Larry's secretary
 Frances Carson as Miss Dunbar

Production
After Garbo's previous film, Ninotchka (1939) was completed,  MGM scheduled Madame Curie as her next picture. Pleased with the financial and critical success of Ninotchka, MGM decided to pair Garbo and Douglas in another romantic comedy. George Cukor, who had directed Garbo in Camille (1936), which is generally regarded as her best film, was assigned to direct. Constance Bennett, a major leading lady of the 1930s whose career was waning, was cast in a supporting role through the efforts of her friend Cukor. The screenplay by S.N. Behrman, Salka Viertel, and George Oppenheimer was based on a 1925 Constance Talmadge silent film titled Her Sister from Paris, which in turn was based on a play by German playwright Ludwig Fulda.

MGM used the film to promote a new image of Garbo as modern and glamorous, hoping to increase her appeal to filmgoers in the United States. Much of the income from Garbo's earlier pictures had come from their popularity with European audiences, which were now unavailable due to World War II. Garbo hated the script for Two-Faced Woman, and did not want to make the film; she was angry and disappointed Madame Curie had been shelved (MGM made the film with Greer Garson in 1943) and was very uncomfortable with the attempt to portray her as a modern "American" woman. Garbo strongly objected to a scene where she is wearing a bathing suit and swimming; She pleaded with director Cukor to have the scene cut, but Cukor, who shared Garbo's reservations about the film, told her it had to remain in the picture. The script also called for Garbo to dance in an elaborate ballroom rhumba scene. Garbo, who was not a natural dancer and disliked dancing in general, was forced to take lessons and once hid from her dance instructor in a tree at her home. She later said that she was embarrassed by the film and that it "was not good and it could never be made good." Garbo recalled that her co-star Melvyn Douglas disliked the film as well and his distaste for it was obvious during the production.

Two-Faced Woman was produced by Gottfried Reinhardt, with music by Bronislau Kaper, cinematography by Joseph Ruttenberg, art direction by Cedric Gibbons, and costume design by Adrian.

Censorship controversy and changes to original version

MGM originally scheduled release of Two-Faced Woman for November, 1941; the film received a Production Code seal of approval, but the National Legion of Decency rated the film as "C" for condemned — unusual at that time for a major Hollywood release — citing its alleged "immoral and un-Christian attitude toward marriage and its obligations: impudently suggestive scenes, dialogue, and situations: suggestive costumes." The film also was condemned by the archbishop of New York, the first time a particular film had been singled out. These condemnations strongly discouraged Catholics from seeing the film. Two-Faced Woman was banned in several cities, including Boston and Providence, Rhode Island, and other cities such as Omaha, Chicago, and Milwaukee ordered that some scenes be cut.

MGM responded to the negative criticism by withdrawing the original cut of the film. Certain scenes were reshot and edited before the official release date. George Cukor refused to participate in the reshooting. In particular, a scene was added in which Larry Blake discovers early in the film that Katherine is actually his estranged wife Karin pretending to be her twin sister and chooses to play along with her pretense rather than actually consider an affair with his sister-in-law. The Legion of Decency changed its rating for the amended film from a "C", meaning condemned, to "B", meaning morally objectionable in part.

In addition to censorship-related changes, the studio also cut a number of Constance Bennett's scenes and changed the ending because some felt that Bennett had upstaged Garbo in many of their scenes together. Even with the cuts, Leonard Maltin wrote in 2014 that Bennett "steal[s] the film with her hilarious performance."

The revamped version of Two-Faced Woman was released in early January 1942. The original, uncensored version of the film still exists, and was shown in 2004 at a George Cukor retrospective at the National Film Theatre in London, but has not been released commercially in either the U.S. or Europe or shown on Turner Classic Movies (owned by WarnerMedia which holds the rights to the pre-1986 MGM film library).

Reception
Upon the amended film's release in January 1942, Garbo received some of the worst reviews of her career. Despite the negative notices, Garbo was awarded The National Board of Review of Motion Pictures Best Acting Award. John Mosher of The New Yorker wrote of Garbo that "one can feel only that the archbishop who opposed the showing of the film was her one true friend. Of Garbo's folly there is little really to say. Just condolences might be enough." Theodore Strauss of The New York Times wrote: "It is hardly necessary to sit in judgment upon such delicate matters of public interest, inasmuch as the film decisively condemns itself by shoddy workmanship. Miss Garbo's current attempt to trip the light fantastic is one of the awkward exhibitions of the season, George Cukor's direction is static and labored, and the script is a stale joke, repeated at length. Considering the several talents that have combined to create this dismal jape, put down Two-Faced Woman as one of the more costly disappointments of the year." It misses the point that Garbo's role is to impersonate her fictional twin sister who unlike her is a novice to dancing. A review in Time called the film "almost as shocking as seeing your mother drunk."

Even those reviews that praised Garbo's performance, still panned the film in general. Variety wrote: "That the experiment of converting Miss Garbo into a comedienne is not entirely successful is no fault of hers. Had the script writers and the director, George Cukor, entered into the same spirit of the thing with as much enthusiasm, lack of self-consciousness and abandon as the star, the result would have been a smash hit...Just how some of the lines of dialog escaped the scissors is as much of a mystery as how the screen writers...so completely flopped in providing a reasonably satisfactory finale." Harrison's Reports called Garbo's performance "brilliant...yet if it were not for her charms and fine acting ability there would be little to recommend, for the story is weak and somewhat silly." Film Daily declared Garbo "a delightful comedienne" but called it "unfortunate that the combined talents" of the scriptwriters "do not measure up to those of Miss Garbo's. George Cukor's direction is not as keen as it could be and tends to let the film ramble."

Due to the critical failure of the film, many sources have said that the film also did poorly at the box office. According to MGM records, it earned $875,000 in the United States and Canada, and $925,000 in other markets, resulting in an initial loss of $62,000. Despite the previous success of Ninotchka, audiences had difficulty accepting Garbo as a comedian. Attendance also was impacted by the Japanese attack on Pearl Harbor, which occurred three weeks before the film was released. A few sources have challenged the general perception that the picture was a financial flop, with at least one stating that it eventually made back five times its budget.

Later in 1942, Garbo's MGM contract was terminated by mutual agreement. Contrary to popular belief, Garbo did not quit movies because of the poor reception to Two-Faced Woman; she fully intended to return to films following the end of World War II. Since she was no longer under a studio contract, she was able to be highly selective over any roles offered to her; for various reasons, several later film projects which interested her did not come to fruition, leaving Two-Faced Woman as her final film.

References

External links 

 
 
 
 

1941 films
1941 romantic comedy films
American black-and-white films
American romantic comedy films
1940s English-language films
Films directed by George Cukor
Films scored by Bronisław Kaper
Films set in Idaho
Films set in New York City
Metro-Goldwyn-Mayer films
Films about twin sisters
1940s American films